The Information Network Security Administration or INSA is the national signals intelligence and cybersecurity agency of Ethiopia, founded by Abiy Ahmed when the Ethiopian People's Revolutionary Democratic Front (EPRDF) was the ruling party of Ethiopia.

Creation
The Information Network Security Administration was founded by Abiy Ahmed, who later (in 2018) became Prime Minister of Ethiopia, during the EPRDF's period in power. The legal basis of creating INSA in 2006 was the Council of Ministers Regulation No.130/2006, with goals including defence of Ethiopian information infrastructure. Among the initial activities of INSA was spying on dissidents among the Ethiopian diaspora using "sophisticated intrusion and surveillance software", and to lay legal charges against journalists and opposition activists and politicians of "treason" and "terrorism".

Legal changes
The Council of Ministers Regulation No.250/2011 and Proclamation No.808/2013 updated the initial legal definitions of INSA.

Leadership and structure
On 20 April 2018, Temesgen Tiruneh was appointed Director-General of INSA. Who later become director of NISS. As of Februarys 2021 the head of INSA was  Shumete Gizaw.

In October 2018, responsibility for INSA was given to the Ministry of Peace. It was reverted back to the office of the prime minister in October 2021.

Password incident
In 2019, INSA was the subject of notoriety when a crack revealed that more than half of a sample of 300 agents were using extremely simple passwords.

References

Government agencies of Ethiopia
Signals intelligence agencies